Edgar is a masculine given name that may also be a family name. 

Edgar may also refer to:

Arts and entertainment
 Edgar (opera), an opera by Giacomo Puccini
 Edgar Award, an award presented yearly by the Mystery Writers of America
 edgar, a play by David Grimm
 Edgar, a song by Jean Leloup
 Edgar, a band with Nikki  Leonti

Places

Canada
 Edgar,  Ontario, a ghost town

United States
 Edgar, Illinois, an unincorporated community
 Edgar, Nebraska, a city 
 Edgar, West Virginia
 Edgar, Wisconsin, a village 
 Edgar County, Illinois, a county
 Edgar Township (disambiguation), multiple places

People
 Edgar (footballer, born 1986), Gladson do Nascimento, Brazilian football forward
 Edgar (footballer, born 1987), Edgar Bruno da Silva, Brazilian football striker
 Edgar (footballer, born 1991), Edgar dos Passos Pinto, Brazilian football right-back
 King Edgar (disambiguation)

Other uses
 Emission Database for Global Atmospheric Research (EDGAR)
 EDGAR, a filing format system of the U.S. Securities and Exchange Commission
 HMS Edgar, multiple ships of the Royal Navy of the United Kingdom
 Edgar-class cruiser, a nine-ship class of protected cruiser built around 1891 for the Royal Navy
 Edgar, standard botanical author abbreviation for Elizabeth Edgar

See also
 Eadgar (disambiguation)
 Edgars (disambiguation)
 Edgard (disambiguation)
 Edgardo, the Italian-language form of Edgar